Michael Beard or Mike Beard could refer to:

Mike Beard (baseball) (born 1950), American baseball player
Mike Beard (politician) (born 1953), American politician